Blanka Wladislaw (born Blanka Wertheim, 3 June 1917 – d. 26 January 2012) was a Brazilian chemist of Polish-Jewish descent.

Biography
Wladislaw was born Blanka Wertheim on 3 June 1917, in Warsaw, Congress Poland, a part of the Russian Empire. Her family emigrated to Brazil when she was 14, where they have faced great financial difficulty on their arrival in São Paulo. She decided to dedicate herself to her studies in order to enter the University of São Paulo and in 1937 accomplished this, entering the university's Faculty of Philosophy, Sciences and Letters and graduated in 1941. In 1949, she completed her doctorate with her thesis analyzing the behavior of various sulfur compounds in presesence of Raney nickel catalysts, advisor Heinrich Hauptmann, and joined the Faculty of Philosophy, Sciences, and Letters as an assistant to Hauptmann.

In 1949, she joined the faculty of Organic and Biological Chemistry at the USP to become and became full time assistant professor in 1953. Blanka got a grant from the British government to conduct postdoctoral studies at the Imperial College London on organic electrosynthesis. In the following decade, Wladislaw researched with organic electrochemistry, again with sulfur compounds. Returning to this field of study in 1971, she would at the same time be promoted to become a full time professor at USP's Institute of Chemistry and in 1975 started the University's Department of Fundamental Chemistry.

Legacy
Blanka Wladislaw wrote more than 115 research papers, 171 papers in congress, and directed four Master's dissertations and 24 Doctoral theses. After retiring, she wrote a guide to the teaching of chemistry and remained at the University of São Paulo as a guest teacher.

In 1973, she was elected a full member of the Brazilian Academy of Sciences, Brazilian Association of Chemists, Royal Society of Chemistry (MRSC), and the Brazilian Society for the Advancement of Science. The following year she became a member of the São Paulo Academy of Sciences. For the quality of her work in the field of chemistry, Wladislaw was awarded the Brazilian National Order of Scientific Merit and the Rheimboldt-Hauptmann Award.

References

1917 births
2012 deaths
20th-century Brazilian scientists
20th-century Polish scientists
20th-century women scientists
Academics of Imperial College London
Jewish emigrants from Nazi Germany to Brazil
Brazilian women chemists
Brazilian chemists
Electrochemists
Members of the Brazilian Academy of Sciences
Naturalized citizens of Brazil
People from Warsaw Governorate
Polish emigrants to Brazil
Recipients of the National Order of Scientific Merit (Brazil)
University of São Paulo alumni
Academic staff of the University of São Paulo